BJHS may refer to:

 The British Journal for the History of Science, a quarterly journal
 Bob Jones High School, a high school in Madison, Alabama
  Benign joint hypermobility syndrome